Comarca Metropolitana de Almería is a comarca and metropolitan area in the province of Almería, Spain. It contains the following municipalities:
 Almería
 Benahadux
 Gádor
 Huércal de Almería
 Níjar
 Pechina
 Rioja
 Santa Fe de Mondújar
 Viator

References 

Comarcas of Andalusia
Geography of the Province of Almería